The 2023 Supercard of Honor is the upcoming fifteenth Supercard of Honor professional wrestling pay-per-view produced by American promotion Ring of Honor (ROH). It will take place on March 31, 2023, at the Galen Center in Los Angeles, California.  Wrestlers from ROH's sister promotion All Elite Wrestling (AEW) will also be featured.

Production

Background
Supercard of Honor is a pay-per-view professional wrestling event annually presented by Ring of Honor (ROH), and primarily takes place during the weekend of WrestleMania - the flagship event of WWE, and considered to be the biggest wrestling event of the year. It has been a yearly tradition since 2006. The shows are sometimes two-day events, traditionally taking place on Friday nights and/or Saturday afternoons, and are held either in or nearby the same city as that year's WrestleMania.

On January 11, 2023, it was announced that Supercard of Honor would take place on March 31 at the Galen Center in Los Angeles, California.

Storylines
The event will feature professional wrestling matches that involve different wrestlers from pre-existing scripted feuds and storylines. Wrestlers portray villains, heroes, or less distinguishable characters in scripted events that build tension and culminate in a wrestling match or series of matches. Storylines will be produced on ROH's weekly series ROH Honor Club TV  exclusively on their streaming service Honor Club, on television programs of sister promotion All Elite Wrestling including Dynamite and Rampage, on AEW's supplementary online streaming shows Dark and Elevation, and via promotional videos on both the ROH and AEW YouTube channels.

On December 10, 2022 at Final Battle, The Briscoe Brothers (Jay Briscoe and Mark Briscoe) defeated FTR (Dax Harwood and Cash Wheeler) in a Dog Collar match to win the ROH World Tag Team Championship. However, Jay was killed in a car accident on January 17, 2023. Following various tributes and allowing some time to pass out of respect for Jay, the titles were formally vacated on the March 10 episode of Rampage. Mark would later announce that new champions would be crowned in a "Reach for the Sky" ladder match – named as such for being the name of the Briscoes' entrance music, and as a way to honor Jay – at Supercard of Honor. The Lucha Brothers (Penta El Zero Miedo and Rey Fénix) would be announced as the first team in the match

Matches

See also
2023 in professional wrestling
List of Ring of Honor pay-per-view events

References

2023 in professional wrestling
2023 in California
Events in Los Angeles
2023
Ring of Honor pay-per-view events
Professional wrestling in Los Angeles
March 2023 events in the United States
Scheduled professional wrestling shows